The Bushveld Igneous Complex (BIC) is the largest layered igneous intrusion within the Earth's crust. It has been tilted and eroded forming the outcrops around what appears to be the edge of a great geological basin: the Transvaal Basin. It is approximately 2 billion years old and is divided into four different limbs: the northern, southern, eastern, and western limbs. The Bushveld Complex comprises the Rustenburg Layered suite, the Lebowa Granites and the Rooiberg Felsics, that are overlain by the Karoo sediments. The site was first discovered around 1897 by Gustaaf Molengraaff.

Located in South Africa, the BIC contains some of the richest ore deposits on Earth. The complex contains the world's largest reserves of platinum-group metals (PGMs) or platinum group elements (PGEs)—platinum, palladium, osmium, iridium, rhodium, and ruthenium along with vast quantities of iron, tin, chromium, titanium and vanadium. These are used in, but not limited to, jewellery, automobiles and electronics. Gabbro or norite is also quarried from parts of the complex and rendered into dimension stone. There have been more than 20 mine operations. There have been studies of potential uranium deposits. The complex is well known for its chromitite reef deposits, particularly the Merensky reef and the UG-2 reef. It represents about 75 percent of the world's platinum and about 50 percent of the world's palladium resources. In this respect, the Bushveld complex is unique and one of the most economically significant mineral deposit complexes in the world.

Geology

Origin and formation 
The Bushveld Igneous Complex covers a pear-shaped area in the central Transvaal. It is divided into an eastern and western lobe, with a further northern extension.

All three sections of the system were formed around the same time—about 2 billion years ago—and are remarkably similar. Vast quantities of molten rock from Earth's mantle were brought to the surface through long vertical cracks in Earth's crust—huge arcuate differentiated lopolithic intrusions—creating the geological intrusion known as the Bushveld Igneous Complex.

These intrusions are thought to predate the nearby Vredefort impact to the south, by some 30 million years. The effects of these injections of molten rock over time, combined with the crystallisation of different minerals at different temperatures, resulted in the formation of a structure rather like a layered cake consisting of distinct rock strata, including three PGM-bearing layers, referred to as reefs. Large portions of the central area are covered by younger rocks.

The extrusions were emplaced over an early diabasic sill, outcrops of which are visible on the southeastern side of the Complex. These are typically greenish in colour and composed of clinopyroxene, altered to hornblende and plagioclase, and are regarded as the earliest phase of the Complex.

The Complex includes layered mafic intrusions (the Rustenburg Layered Suite) and a felsic phase.

Lithologies vary from largely ultramafic peridotite, chromitite, harzburgite, and bronzitite in the lower sections to mafic norite, anorthosite, and gabbro toward the top, and the mafic Rustenburg Layered Suite is followed by a felsic phase (the Lebowa Granite Suite).

The orebodies within the complex include the UG2 (Upper Group 2) reef containing up to 43.5% chromite, and the platinum-bearing horizons Merensky Reef and Platreef. The Merensky Reef varies from 30 to 90 cm in thickness. It is a norite with extensive chromitite and sulfide layers or zones containing the ore.

The Reef contains an average of 10 ppm platinum group metals in pyrrhotite, pentlandite, and pyrite as well as in rare platinum group minerals and alloys. The Merensky and UG-2 reefs contain approximately 90% of the world's known PGM reserves. About 80% of the platinum and 20% of the palladium mined each year are produced from these horizons.

Proposed mechanisms of formation 
The formation mechanisms of the chromitite seams in the  Bushveld Igneous Complex are highly debated: numerous mechanisms have been proposed. The following is a non-exhaustive list of chromitite formations process.

 Changes in chemical and physical properties causes the magma to become concentrated in chromite. When this happens the liquidus becomes free from any other phases. Therefore, chromite is the only mineral to crystallize in the melt thus, accumulating in monomineralic layers on the floor of the magma chamber.
 Increase in total pressure of the system, oxygen fugacity and alpha-silica.
 One of the most accepted mechanisms were proposed by Irvine: it is suggested the chromitites may have formed when a chemically primitive magma intruded into an existing chamber to mix with a differentiated magma.
 Gravity and size controlled settling and separation of chromite (concurring with olivine and OPX) grains within crystal-rich slurries 
 The mixing of resident magma and granitic melts derived from fusible country rocks
 Mixing of ultramafic magma of layered intrusions, with magma parental to anorthosites 
 Deformation of the magma chamber, nucleation, ascent and expansion of gas bubbles or the emplacement of a new pulse of magma increasing total pressure conditions.
 An increase in oxygen fugacity of the magma within the chamber possibly through the release of gas pressure, differential diffusion of hydrogen, or loss of gasses by diffusion.
 Absorption of water by the magma 

There has been a proposal of the origins of at least three different processes used to model the PGE mineralization in the area:

 Collection by the sulphide liquids, due to the PGE's affinity towards a sulphide melt 
 Directly crystallised from a silicate magma, and then collected by oxide minerals
 Concentration by hydrothermal and or hydromagmatic fluids

Structures 
The Bushveld Igneous Complex is a layered mafic intrusion (LMI) with well-defined ore bodies of stratiform chromitite layers concentrated with the so-called Critical Zone; these are referred to as reefs. The three main reef deposits are the Merensky reef, UG-2 Reef, and the Platreef. These reefs are mostly continuous to discontinuous chromite layers with amounts of PGE mineralization. The surface rocks are exposed as separate lobes or limbs (the main ones being eastern, western and northern limbs) spans an area of approximately 66,000 km2. This large igneous province comprises the three main igneous suites the Lebowa Granite Suite (large A-type granitic intrusions), Rustenburg Layered Suite (c. 8 km-thick layered mafic-ultramafic cumulate sequence), and the Rashoop Granophyre Suite (granophyric rocks). These are exposed as layered sequences of sheet like intrusions that are commonly subdivided as five main zones (from bottom to surface): Marginal, Lower, Critical, Main, and Upper Zones. These can be seen in sequence within the mentioned lobes. As for the center area, it is dominated by granites and other related rocks.

A large metamorphic contact aureole is observed within the northern limb, the Potgietersrus area.

The Vredefort impact structure is predated by the BIC intrusion and has been shown to be likely unrelated to the BIC's mineralization.

The Merensky Reef can be subdivided into 5 layers (from bottom to top):

 Mottled Anorthosite (Mer-Ano): light coloured footwall (base of the overlying chromite layers) anorthosite with dark-coloured bands of pyroxene oikocrysts. This layer has a much higher ratio in Pd/Pt minerals (~20:2) and contains Fe-poor sulphides such as chalcopyrite, pentlandite, pyrrhotite with minor amounts of galena and sphalerite.
 Lower Chromitite (Mer-ChL): dark coloured layer of subhedral to anhedral chromite with varying grain sizes from 0.5 to 2 mm in diameter, enclosed by plagioclase (some observed relicts within poikilitic feldspar with comparable sizes to the anorthosite base layer) and orthopyroxene oikocrysts. This layer is terminated by a sharp footwall contact. In terms of mineralization, in contains minor amounts (c. 0.7%) of granular pentlandite, chalcopyrite, pyrrhotite and pyrite. The PGE mineralization is dominated by Pt-sulphides and other Pt-minerals with minor amounts of Pd-minerals resulting in a high Pt/Pd ratio (c. 106:4).
 Upper Chromitite (Mer-ChU): somewhat similar to the Lower Chromitite layer, but the chromite grains are finer (0.2 to·4 mm) and more densely packed. It is again Pt-mineral dominant with respect to Pd with minor amounts of Cu-Ni-rich sulphides (chalcopyrite, pentlandite and minor pyrrhotite).
 Merensky Pegmatite (Mer-Peg): a green-brown layer of coarse-grained to pegmatitic melanorite that is about 2.4 to 2.8 cm thick. It contains blebby patches of intercumulus plagioclase with meso- to adcumulate pyroxenite with some orthopyroxene grains reaching sizes of up to 5 cm. Chromite grains are next to absent with minor amounts near the upper chromitite contact. Sulphide mineralization is again less than c. 0.7% of the minerals and is dominated by Fe-rich sulphides (more pyrrhotite with respect to pentlandite and chalcopyrite). There are lesser amounts of PGMs compared to the chromitites.
 Merensky Melanorite (Mer-Nor): Somewhat similar to the previous layer, but is a finer (medium-grained) orthocumulate melanorite with an account 1.6% of disseminated and intergranular to granular Fe-dominant sulphide mineralization (pyrrhotite with some pentlandite and chalcopyrite). It is however more chalcopyrite-rich, but occurs as smaller (< 1.5 mm) grains than those found within the pegmatite. There is intercumulus quartz and is noted to have Rare Earth Element (REE)-bearing minerals and albite–anorthite–orthoclase symplectites.

The UG2 Pyroxenite (Reef): The host rock of the UG2 chomitites is dominated by granular orthopyroxene, interstitial plagioclase and clinopyroxene with minor variable amounts accessory minerals such as phlogopite. The UG2 chromitites are underlain by pyroxenite footwall that is distinct from hanging wall pyroxenite. Chromite subhedral to subrounded (less than 0.5 mm in size) grains are a minor (c. 4%) but constant phase that is embedded with orthopyroxene (and other interstitial phases such as mentioned) throughout this footwall pyroxenite. Large oikocrysts are visible within the outcrops and on mine walls.

The Platreef: this reef structure is divided into three sections:

 The Lower Reef is composed of norites and feldspathic pyroxenites that have been recrystallized and overprinted. This layer has abundant country-rock xenoliths particularly near the base of the layer.
 The Central or Middle Reef is composed of igneous peridotite and recrystallized "vari-textured" mafic rocks with metasedimentary xenoliths.
 The Upper Reef is composed primarily of plagioclase-pyroxenite and norite that gradually changed to norite and gabbronorite towards the Main Zone (see units) contact. There are xenoliths but these are relatively scarce brecciated chromitite within the feldspathic pyroxenite near the top of the reef.

Units 

The general mineral assemblage of the chromitite seams in the Bushveld Complex consists of olivine + chromite, chromite +/- bronzite + plagioclase, chromite + plagioclase, and chromite + clinopyroxene.

The BIC's layered sequence is commonly divided into five different zones:

 Upper Zone : This is the uppermost component of the Rustenburg Layered Suite (RLS). This zone is a thick gabbroic succession and is laterally dominant in iron-rich cumulates that host one of the world's largest titanium-magnetite resources. The general rock assemblage is Gabbro + Olivine diorite + Anorthorsite. The upper zone is approximately 1,000-2,700 m thick and is composed of gabbro and anorthosite which overlays more differentiated rocks such as diorite progressively. The Upper Zone composes of 24 major layers of massive magnetite up to roughly 6 m thick. The contact between the Main and Upper Zones is commonly defined via the first occurrence of cumulus magnetite. On the other hand, some workers place the boundary on a notable pyroxenite layer characterized by reversals in stratigraphic trends of Sr isotopic ratios and iron enrichment that is located hundreds of meters under the first occurrence of cumulus magnetite.
 Main Zone : This is composed of a succession of gabbronorites with bands of pyroxenite and anorthosite. The Main Zone is roughly 1,600–3,500 m thick. There is a uniform sequence of cumulates consisting of norite and gabbronorite. The anorthosite layers make up roughly 5 percent of the lithology. Moreover, pyroxenite is scarce, and magnesian olivine and chromium spinel are not present in this zone.
 Critical Zone : Approximately 930-1500m thick, delimited as its section because it contains several chromitite seams/layers, this is where the chromitite layers are concentrated: composed of Lower Group chromites (LG) LG1-LG7, LG6 (subdivided as LG6A, LG6B), Middle Group chromites (found between lcz and ucz, t boundary) (MG) MG1 to MG4, and Uper Group chromites (UG) UG1 and UG2 for a total of 13 chromite seams recognized in the Critical zone. Zone subdivided as Upper and Lower critical subzones. However, as many as 25 individual chromite layers have been identified in the critical zone alone with 14 being identified as major chromitite seams subdivided into four different type: Type I-LCZ base cycles, Type II-UCZ base cycles, Type III-thin intermediate layer within cyclens, Type IV-stringers associated to OPX pegmatoids.
 Upper Critical Zone: Approximately 450-1000m thick, defined as Anorthosite layer found between two chromite layers, MG2 and MG3 chromitites, with repetitive or cyclic layers of (the cyclic origin is disputed whether it is multiple injections of new magma or if it is by basal settling of a crystal mush transported by slurry flow),  chromites overlain by harzburgite (not always present), then pyroxenite, norite and finally anorthosite.
 Lower Critical Zone: It is an olivine-rich ultramafic cumulates that is approximately 500 m thick, composed entirely of ultramafic cumulates, dominated by pyroxenite with some presence of cumulus plagioclase in some rock layers. The LGs (LG1-LG7) hosted by this feldspathic pyroxenite contains LG6 is the thickest and most economic chromitite seam in Bushveld with a general rock assemblage of Pyroxenite, Harzburgite, Dunite 
 Lower Zone: The general rock assemblage is Pyroxenite + Harzburgite + Dunite. The Lower Zone is roughly 900–1,600 m in thickness and is composed of layered olivine-saturated and orthopyroxene-saturated cumulates. The chromitite layers in this zone are only known from the northern and western parts of the complex.
 Marginal Zone: (not always present) is a section that is up to 250 m thick, composed of massive, fine to medium-grained norite and gabbronorite with varying amounts of accessory minerals such as quartz, hornblende, clinopyroxene, and biotite. This is a clear indication of metasediments contaminating the magma.

Industry

Mining 

The area has many different ore deposits, but mostly with a focus on PGEs (primarily platinum and palladium), vanadium, iron (generally from magnetite), chromium, uranium, tin, ... There are multiple major mining companies that are heavily involved within this area, particularly AngloAmerican, African Rainbow Minerals, Impala Platinum, Northam Platinum Ltd., Lonmin plc, and more recently Bushveld Minerals. It has been reported that more than 20 billion metric tons of PGE ore rock has been indicated in South Africa by the different exploration and mining companies of which contains about 38.1 kilotons of platinum metal in mineral reserves and resources in the Bushveld. The sum of PGEs and Gold resources and reserves equates to a total of about 72 kilotons from the Bushveld Complex alone. Most are underground mines (such as Longhole Stoping, Drift-and-Fill mining, etc.), fewer are open pit like the large Mogalakwena mine.

Environmental and health issues 
Mining feasibility studies have identified impacts on surface water, groundwater, wetlands, flora, fauna and related social issues. Additionally, these impacts include increased drainage of salts, sediments thought channels and streams near the mine sites. There has been an increased fleeting dust generation contaminating air and water, surface water runoff is leading to a decrease in water recharge for downstream users, possibly the loss of certain vulnerable flora and fauna species, soil compaction and land erosion; the contamination and quality deterioration of the surface and ground water is driven by seepage from waste rock dumps, stockpiles, gas spills, etc. The mining activities that make large use of water could potentially lead to dewatering of local aquifers. Moreover, construction activity impacts such as removal of natural land and noise from machinery and vehicles may disrupt the surrounding ecosystems.

Depending on the beneficiation and concentration methods, there are different impacts plausible such acid runoff from leaching and metal slimes. Hexavalent Chromite from mine wastes has been shown to be highly toxic.

A study has shown that up to 5% of the world total production of PGEs is lost and emitted as dust entering the global biogeochemical cycle. Nearby towns have shown elevated levels of platinum within the soil, atmosphere and vegetation. Since some of the food production activities are located near these areas, the primary concern is that the local population (several towns and cities, including Rustenburg with more than 500'000 inhabitants) will ultimately be exposed to the contaminants either by skin contact, dietary intake or even inhalation. PGEs such as platinum, palladium, and rhodium have been shown to bioaccumulate under the form of PGE-Chloride in the liver, kidneys, bones and lungs. The intake is generally through metallic or oxide dust that is inhaled or is absorbed through the skin causing contact dermatitis, on the long term causing sensitization and can eventually to lead to cancers. A study from January 2013, has shown an increasing trend of the development of silicosis caused by silica dust and asbestos fibers related to workers mining in the Bushveld igneous complex. Similarly, another study has found high concentrations of microscopic (<63 μm) PGE airborne dust particles near the mining areas. These have been found to be transported surface runoff and atmospherically, then further concentrated into soils and rivers such as the Hex River which flows directly into Rustenburg, the most populated municipality of North West Province of South Africa.

A study from Maboeta et al. in 2006, has revealed through chemical analysis that the soil from a tailings disposal facility had higher levels of C, N, NH4 and K in comparison to the other general sampling sites. The difference was attributed to rehabilitation regimes being implemented reducing the abundance of these microbial and bacterial nutrients.

Mining operations in general consume much energy and water, producing much waste rock, trailings and greenhouse gases. A study has shown that PGM mining has a significant impact on the global environment. However, the environmental costs for platinum mines are only slightly higher in energy, somewhat lower in water and moderately higher in greenhouse gas emissions when compared to gold mining.

Social issues 
South Africa's economy is heavily tied to its mining industry and has been greatly affected by low metal prices. Mining companies have had to cut costs by lowering production, closing mines, selling off projects, and reducing the work force. Miners are quite often on strike asking to get the minimum salary, and mines continue to fail safety standards and face labour unrest. A research study in 2016 by eunomix showed that Rustenburg, one of the fastest-growing cities in South Africa, has an "abnormally high concentration of young men who are separated from their families due to the migrant labour system". The population is facing a lack of education, high crime levels, and health problems within the workforce. Additionally, they are facing high poverty levels, government deficits, and are still heavily dependent on the platinum mining industry which is "responsible for more than  65% of local GDP and 50% of all direct jobs" (over 70,000 jobs). The accommodations and housing are lacking and have seen little to no effort from the mining companies to improve them. However, recently (2013–2016), the platinum companies have contributed more than ZAR 370 million into the city; funding local infrastructure, water supply and treatment centres, sporting programmes, tourism, public road expansions, sewage treatment plants, cultural activities. The primary concern is the combination of high poverty rates and social injustice.

Operations 
There have been much more than 30 individual mine operations mostly mining for PGEs, some chrome, tin, and others (of which most are underground, few are open cut). These are shown below as a non-exhaustive list:

 Western Lobe: Rustenburg, Impala, Bafokeng Rasimone, Union, Amandelbult (composed of Tumela and Dishaba), Northam, Hartebeestpoort, Styldrift, Elandsfontein, Crocodile River, Thaba, Vametco Mine,  Pandora, Lonmin, Marikana. Kroondal, Rooiberg Tin mine, Leeuwpoort, Pilanesberg, 2008 Prospects: Frishgewaagd Ledig, Leeuwkop
 Eastern Lobe: Lebowa/Bokoni, Twickenham, Marula, Modikwa, Smokey Hills, Two Rivers, Mototolo, Everest, Limpopo and Mogalakwena (Potgietersrus), Maandagshoek, Middelpunt Hill, Blue Ridge, 2008 Prospects: Ga-Phasha, Kennedy's Vale, Sheba's Ridge and Booysendal

Reserves 

The three largest ore bodies are the Merensky Reef, the UG2 Chromitite Reef and the Platreef:

 The Merensky Reef is a predominantly sulfide-rich pyroxinite layer mined on both the eastern and western limbs of the Bushveld Complex not only supplies most of the world's PGEs but also notable amounts of copper, nickel, cobalt and gold as byproducts.
 The UG2 Chromitite Reef, known as the UG2 Reef Upper Group 2, is a chromite-rich layer that lacks sulfide minerals. As a whole, it is possibly one of the largest resources in terms of platinum group elements, larger than the overlying Merensky Reef. and is also mined on both the eastern and western limbs.
 The Platreef is the world's third largest PGE deposit (after UG2 and Merensky reefs). The ore body is composed of three "broadly mineralised horizons rather than a distinct reef".

* Table modified from USGS, 2010.

Most of the identified mineral inventory is from the three described reefs, most of it is located within the eastern limb but most of the reserves are found within the western limb.

Economy 
The chrome deposits of the Bushveld forms the majority in terms of the proportion of all the known chrome reserves of the world. This area is very strategic as it is easy and cheap for mining; this is because their continuity in thick seams over scores of miles of strike and their persistence in depth, which has all been proved via deep drilling. Just like the chrome seams, Bushveld's titano-magnetite seams of the Main Zone illustrates similar continuity and persistence though, have not been extracted to date. Contained within the titano-magnetite ore is a persistent fractional percentage of vanadium. Reserves of the titanium and vanadium in these iron ores could potentially be very large. With that being said, it is evident that the ores existing in Bushveld occupy an important place in the world of mineral resources.

Although other major platinum deposits have been found in places like the Sudbury Basin or Norilsk (Russia), the Bushveld Complex still remains as one of the prime sources of PGE ore. There have been many strikes for unfair pay and working conditions, illegal miners (so-called "zama-zamas"), gun-fire conflicts, political swindles and legal fights. The prime use of platinum is for auto-catalytic converters (in cars) and jewellery. That said, the value of platinum which used to be significant larger than that of gold for a long, however it has now plummeted below gold and has stayed below it since late 2014. This is in part due to fluctuations in production rates, global demand, strikes, ...

The total net demand of PGE in 2012 was 197.4 metric tons according to a Johnson Matthey 2013 estimate. The demand of platinum has somewhat steadily been increasing, driven by the more intensive use per capita with developing area and urbanization, the demand reached an all-time high in 2005 of 208.3 metric tons. From 1975 to 2013, the autocatalytic and jewellery industry dominated the market with more than 70% of the gross demand. Jewellery was barely ahead of autocatalysts prior to 2002 with brute gross demand values being somewhat similar or higher. From 2002 to 2003, the gross demand significantly decreased in jewellery (87.7 to 78.1 tons), but has largely increased in autocatalysts (80.6 to 101.7 tons) and has since then almost consistently dominated the market (with 2009 being the one exception linked to weak car sales). In 2016, the platinum market continued to be in deficit for the 5th consecutive year, just barely reaching a demand 200,000 oz. In 2017, the two still dominate the market gross demand by far. That being said, the global platinum demand is still expected to increase in subsequent years to 2017.

The price of platinum is quite volatile in comparison to gold, but both have greatly increased over the last century. Despite platinum being far much rarer than gold, 2014 was the last year platinum was valued at a higher price than gold (2018). This coincides with the 2014 South African platinum strike.

Platinum is more likely to be affected by social, environmental, political and economic issues where as gold not as much. This is because platinum has large mineral resources already identified and is not expected to be depleted for many decades (potentially up to year 2040). Furthermore, the resource is geographically restricted with the 3 by far most significant resources BIC, The great dyke (Zimbabwe) and Noril'sk-Talnakh in Russia. An important detail to note is palladium has been and is considered as the alternative to platinum. Recently (2017), the supply-demand gap has greatly decreased. Looking at political and social issues, there have been quite a few platinum mining-related strikes since before the 21st century: 1986 Impala strike, 1986 Gencor, 2004 Impala & Anglo Plats strikes, 2007 South Africa miners' strike, 2012 Marikana killings, Lonmin 2013 strike, 2014 South African platinum strike.

See also 

 Platinum group metals
 Cumulate rocks
 Ultramafic to mafic layered intrusions
 Hans Merensky
 Waterberg Biosphere
 Stillwater igneous complex

References

External links 

 USGS: Platinum-Group Elements in Southern Africa—Mineral Inventory and an Assessment of Undiscovered Mineral Resources
 USGS: Stratiform Chromite Deposit Model
 Concentration of Particulate Platinum-Group Minerals during Magma Emplacement; a Case Study from the Merensky Reef, Bushveld Complex
 Origin of the UG2 chromitite layer, Bushveld Complex
 A Novel Hypothesis for Origin of Massive Chromitites in the Bushveld Igneous Complex
 Bushveld Igneous Complex by Judith A. Kinnaird (PDF 39 pages) – retrieved 2009-05-22
 Photos of Bushveld Igneous Complex (Rustenburg Layered Suite) – field exposures (University of Cape Town) retrieved 2018-03-23
 Bushveld Igneous Complex (Rustenburg Layered Suite)- thin section photomicrographs (University of Cape Town) retrieved 2018-03-23

Sources 

Economic geology
Geology of South Africa
Layered intrusions
Palladium
Proterozoic magmatism